Our Lady of Navigators also known as Our Lady of Seafarers (Nossa Senhora dos Navegantes in Portuguese) is a devotional title given to the Virgin Mary by Roman Catholics. It is a widespread devotion in South America, especially in Brazil, where her holy day is celebrated on 2 February, it is an official holiday on the city of Porto Alegre. Several churches in Brazil are dedicated to Our Lady of Navigators.

History

The devotion started in the fifteenth century by Europeans, especially the Portuguese navigators, praying for a safe return to their homes. They saw the Virgin Mary as their protector during storms and other hazards. The first statue in South America was brought from Portugal to Brazil.

In Brazil, the Procissão no Mar, a religious procession where the image of the Virgin Mary is carried take place in most coastal cities that have harbors, specially the large ones.

The theme of the "Virgin Mary as the protector" was similarly used in The Virgin of the Navigators, painted sometime between 1531 and 1536 by Alejo Fernández. Depicting Mary and Spanish monarchs and explorers, this is the earliest known painting whose subject is the discovery of the Americas. It was painted as an altarpiece for, and remains at, a chapel of the Casa de Contratación in Alcázar of Seville, Seville, Spain.

The Brazilian city of Navegantes is named after Our Lady of Navigators.

Gallery of churches

See also
 Virgin of Mercy
 Our Lady, Star of the Sea
 Ave Maris Stella
 Roman Catholic Marian art
 The Virgin of the Navigators
 Our Lady of Navigators church

Notes

Sources
 Nossa Senhora dos Navegantes

External links

 Capela de Nossa Senhora dos Navegantes, Ilhavo :pt:Capela de Nossa Senhora dos Navegantes
 Igreja de Nossa Senhora dos Navegantes, Parque das Nações 

Virgin Mary in art
Catholic Church in Brazil
Catholic devotions